Oleh Kotelyukh (born 19 June 1979 in Boryspil) is a Ukrainian professional football defender.

Career
He played in the Ukrainian First League for FC Zirka Kirovohrad. He joined Kryvbas from Borysfen in 2005.

Kotelyukh was born on 19 June 1979 in the city of Boryspil, in the Ukrainian republic of the Soviet Union (in the Kyiv Oblast of present-day Ukraine).

External links
 Profile at FFU website

1979 births
Living people
Ukrainian footballers
NK Veres Rivne players
FC Borysfen Boryspil players
FC Borysfen-2 Boryspil players
FC Kryvbas Kryvyi Rih players
FC Zirka Kropyvnytskyi players
FC Naftovyk-Ukrnafta Okhtyrka players
PFC Sumy players
FC Arsenal Kyiv players
Association football defenders